Style is the sixth studio album by Japanese recording artist Namie Amuro, released on 10 December 2003 through Avex Trax. Her first studio album in nearly three years, Style follows her crossover into R&B and hip hop that began with the Suite Chic project in 2002. 

Although Amuro has always dabbled with R&B beats, this is her first studio album to predominantly feature the actual style; it was her first album not to be produced by Tetsuya Komuro since her Super Monkeys days, as well as her last collaboration with producer Dallas Austin, The album spawned four singles, "Wishing on the Same Star", "Shine More", "Put 'Em Up" and "So Crazy/Come".

Style debuted at number four on the Oricon Weekly Albums Chart with first week sales of 221,874 copies, the lowest of Amuro's career. The album was later certified Platinum for shipments of over 250,000 copies by the RIAJ.

Overview
The album represents a major shift in Amuro's musical direction, and would set the tone for all of the singer's subsequent releases. AllMusic described the album as "marginally more gritty", taking Amuro "closer in sound to her musical idol, Janet Jackson". Although the album is focused on R&B and hip-hop, it still features some pop songs; Amuro explained that certain styles of songs were included for variety. First editions of the album included two bonus tracks, the Mad Bear remix of "So Crazy" and the movie version of "Wishing on the Same Star".

Several of the album's songs are covers: "Indy Lady" (a cover of "Independent Lady", originally by Toni Estes), "Come" (originally by Sophie Monk), "As Good As" (also recorded by WhatFor) and "Wishing on the Same Star" (originally by Keedy).

The song "Put 'Em Up", which was released as the second single preceding the album, is slightly edited from its original form; instead of fading out, the song comes to an abrupt end. "Lovebite" is a collaboration with Takuro of the Japanese rock band Glay. Takuro and Amuro had previously spoken about collaborating years ago and they finally had an opportunity with this album. "Four Seasons" was used as the theme song to the third InuYasha motion picture, Swords of an Honorable Ruler. The song "Come" has also been used as the 7th ending theme for InuYasha.

Style is Amuro's lowest ranking and selling album. Before its release, Amuro launched her largest tour at the time, Namie Amuro So Crazy Tour featuring Best Singles 2003-2004. Due to the nature of the tour, she only performed the singles from the album. Ultimately, many of the songs from the album have never been performed to a public audience, although she did perform them on an exclusive fan club tour in 2004 that was not open to the public.

Track listing

Personnel 
 Namie Amuro - vocals, background vocals
 Arkitec - vocals
 Verbal - vocals 
 Zeebra - vocals
 Mr. Blistah - additional vocals
 Clench - additional vocals
 Coyass - additional vocals
 Kareb James - background vocals
 L.L. Brothers - background vocals
 Yuko Kawai - background vocals
 Michico - background vocals 
 Dave Cleveland - electric guitar
 Cobra Endo - multiple instruments
 Ron Harris - multiple instruments
 Jeff Lorber - keyboard, guitar
 Monk - multiple instruments
 Murayama-Kishiyama Strings - strings (bonus track: Wishing On The Same Star [Movie Version])
 Jeff Pescetto - guitar
 Yasuharu Nakanishi - piano (bonus track: Wishing On The Same Star [Movie Version])

Production 
 Producers - Full Force, Dallas Austin, T.Kura, Michico, Teddy Riley
 Arrangement - Akira, Dallas Austin, Cobra Endo, Masaki Iehara, T.Kura, Monk, Teddy Riley
 String Arrangement - Tatsuya Murayama
 Mixing - Rob Chiarelli, Kevin "KD" Davis, Junya Endo, T.Kura, Peter Mokran, Koji Morimoto, Yoshiaki Onishi, Teddy Riley, David Z.
 Vocal Direction - Akira, Mayumi Harada, Daisuke Imai, T.Kura, Michico, Kenji Sano
 Remixing - Mad Bear Sound System (bonus track: So Crazy[Mad Bear Mix])
 Photography - Kazunali Tajima
 Art Direction - Tyg

Charts 
Album - Oricon Sales Chart (Japan)

Singles - Oricon Sales Chart (Japan)

Total single sales:  290,118

Total album and single sales:  511,992

References

Style
2003 albums
Albums produced by Dallas Austin
Albums produced by Teddy Riley
Avex Group albums